Social Scientist is a New Delhibased journal published by the Indian School of Social Sciences and Tulika Books in the areas of social sciences and humanities. The journal has been running since 1972 and is edited by the JNU social scientist Prabhat Patnaik. The Managing Editor is Rajendra Prasad. The journal is indexed in the International Bibliography of the Social Sciences and the Bibliography of Asian Studies.

References

External links
JSTOR entry

Sociology journals
Academic journals published in India